Shining Girls is an American thriller streaming television series based on the 2013 novel The Shining Girls by Lauren Beukes. The series stars Elisabeth Moss, Wagner Moura and Jamie Bell. It premiered on Apple TV+ on April 29, 2022. A portion of the series premiered at South by Southwest on March 11, 2022.

Premise
Kirby Mazrachi is an archivist at the Chicago Sun-Times. Years ago, she was brutally attacked and left for dead, but her assailant was never found. Today she is still traumatized by the assault and struggles to make sense of her reality that keeps changing. Determined to find her attacker, she discovers a murder that has a striking resemblance to her own attack. Kirby enlists the help of reporter Dan Velazquez and together they uncover several decades-old cold cases of similar murders and begin the hunt for a mysterious serial killer.

Cast

Main
 Elisabeth Moss as Kirby Mazrachi / Sharon Leads, Chicago Sun-Times archivist who was attacked years ago and left for dead
 Wagner Moura as Dan Velazquez, Sun-Times reporter who helps Kirby track down her assailant
 Phillipa Soo as Dr. Jin-Sook Gwansun (Jinny), researcher at the Adler Planetarium and on Harper's hit list
 Chris Chalk as Marcus, Kirby's husband in one of her shifting realities
 Amy Brenneman as Rachel, Kirby's single mother
 Jamie Bell as Harper Curtis, serial killer, and Kirby's attacker

Recurring
 Christopher Denham as Leo Jenkins, Harper's friend from France during World War I
 Madeline Brewer as Klara Meiser, Harper's girl friend from after World War I
 Karen Rodriguez as Julia Madrigal, one of Harper's murder victims
 Erika Alexander as Abby

Episodes

Production
In May 2013, ahead of the novel's release, Media Rights Capital and Leonardo DiCaprio's Appian Way Productions acquired the rights to develop Lauren Beukes's The Shining Girls for television.

In July 2020, Apple gave a series order for Shining Girls, with Elisabeth Moss announced to star. The adaptation was created and written by Silka Luisa who is executive producer and showrunner. Moss and Lindsey McManus are executive producers under Moss's Love & Squalor Pictures. Leonardo DiCaprio and Jennifer Davisson are also executive producers under Appian Way Productions. The novel's author, Lauren Beukes, and Alan Page Arriaga are also executive producers. In February 2021, Wagner Moura joined the cast, with Jamie Bell joining in May 2021, and Phillipa Soo joining in July 2021. In August 2021, Amy Brenneman joined the cast of the series in a recurring role.

In May 2021, it was reported that Moss, Michelle MacLaren, and Daina Reid would direct the first season, with MacLaren set to direct the first two episodes, Moss set to direct another two episodes, and Reid set to direct the remaining four.

Principal photography began on May 24, 2021, and concluded on October 27, 2021, in Chicago, Illinois.

Differences from the novel
In Beukes' novel, the story is told from the point of view of each of Harper's victims. Show creator, Luisa made Kirby the principal protagonist and told the story through her eyes. Luisa felt that focusing on a single character's point of view made the show more compelling. She said, "With one character you see all the puzzle pieces ... You're sort of going through this maze with Kirby and discovering the mystery along with her."

While Beukes downplayed the character of Harper in her book, Luisa fleshed him out a little to make him more intriguing. She was careful to keep him out of the limelight, but said "[h]is humanness made him almost more unsettling." The show's interpretation of how time works is slightly different from that in the book. Luisa said that she imagined time as being a string that Harper moved up and down on. The closer he is to the top, the more Kirby is affected by his actions. Luisa explained that survivors remain connected to this string, and Shining Girls "is about cutting that string."

Luisa stressed that she never changed the book's message. "I think Lauren [Beukes] has a very specific worldview on grief and trauma that she presents and carrying that forward was really important."

Executive producer and lead actor, Moss remarked that unlike the book, in Shining Girls Kirby and Dan do not become romantically involved. Moss said that an eight-episode TV show is not enough time to adequately develop a love subplot. She added, "If you’re going to do it, we really wanted to do it well", and so instead they chose "to hint at it, and the possibility of it" rather than allow it to evolve.

Other differences between the show and the book have also been reported. In the show, Kirby is ten years older than in the book, and her position at the Chicago Sun-Times is an archivist rather than an intern. In the book the staff at the newspaper know of her attempted murder because they ran the story, whereas in the show Kirby changed her name from Sharon Leads to Kirby Mazrachi in order to keep her assault a secret.

The shifting realities that Kirby experiences in the show, her desk at work changing position, her cat at home becoming a dog, discovering that she is married, do not occur in the book.  Some of the details of Harper's victims are different. Julia Madrigal is killed in 1990, not 1984, and she is connected to Leo, Harper's friend, who is a new character created by the show. The items Harper leaves in his victims are also different. In Kirby's case it is a matchbook, whereas in the book it is a monogrammed lighter.

Release
The series premiered on April 29, 2022, on Apple TV+.

Reception
The review aggregator website Rotten Tomatoes reported an 83% approval rating with an average rating of 7.1/10, based on 41 critic reviews. The website's critics consensus reads, "Shining Girls' time-bending conceit often induces a headache instead of thrills, but Elisabeth Moss' superb performance gives this mystery a riveting center of gravity." Metacritic, which uses a weighted average, assigned a score of 65 out of 100 based on 21 critics, indicating "generally favourable reviews".

Before the series premiere early reviews noted Moss’ performance as a highlight on the show. 

Nick Nafpliotis of AIPTComics gave the series a positive review, writing that it will appeal to "both die-hard book fans and those going into the story with fresh eyes."

References

External links
 
 

2020s American drama television series
2020s American time travel television series
2022 American television series debuts
Apple TV+ original programming
American thriller television series
Television shows based on novels
English-language television shows
Television series by Media Rights Capital
Television shows filmed in Illinois